is Pink Lady's twelfth single, released in May 1979. It peaked at number six on the Oricon charts and number five on the Japanese Music Labo chart. It was the duo's first single to not be written by Shunichi Tokura and Yū Aku.

The song is a cover of the Village People's "In the Navy," but with rewritten Japanese lyrics that have nothing to do with the original content of the song. In the song's chorus the lines "In the navy" have been replaced with "Pink Lady", and "They want you as a new recruit" with "I want you, you want Mie/I want you, you want Kei" (referring to group members Mie and Kei).

According to Billboard, the original and Pink Lady cover versions were pitted against each other by record company Victor.

The song was also featured on the Japanese music show The Best Ten, where it peaked at No. 6.

The single sold approximately 700,000 copies.

The B-side is a cover of the song "Hello Mr. Monkey" by disco group Arabesque, taken from the duo's 1978 live album '78 Jumping Summer Carnival.

Track listing (7" vinyl)

Chart positions

References

External links
 
 

1979 singles
1979 songs
Pink Lady (band) songs
Japanese-language songs
Disco songs
Songs written by Jacques Morali
Songs written by Henri Belolo
Songs written by Victor Willis
Victor Entertainment singles